The Beach Girls and the Monster (aka Monster from the Surf) is a horror and beach party film, released in 1965, directed by and starring Jon Hall.

Plot

Young Richard Lindsay (Arnold Lessing) has given up his career in science in favor of his newfound passion, surfing on the Santa Monica, California beachfront. The beachfront is located near his father and stepmother's house, where he lives. This is to the great displeasure of his father, the noted oceanographer Dr. Otto Lindsay (Jon Hall), who is married to the younger Vicky (Sue Casey). Vicky is dissatisfied with Otto's relative lack of devotion to her. Also living with the Lindsays is Richard's sculptor buddy Mark (Walker Edmiston), who walks with a limp as a result of an auto accident Richard had earlier.

While Vicky hits on her stepson and teases his friend Mark, a monster emerges from the ocean and starts slaughtering the kids on the beach. Dr. Lindsay seems convinced that it is a genetically mutated carnivorous South American "fantigua fish" that has grown large enough in anthropomorphic manner to exist out of the oceans in a loathsome seaweed-shrouded form.

Production

The surfing footage used for the scene where Richard runs a film for Mark was shot by one of the most prolific surf filmmakers of the 1960s, Dale Davis, who produced Walk on the Wet Side, Strictly Hot, and the landmark The Golden Breed. For some release prints, the footage was printed in color.

According to the trailer for the film, the dancing girls seen in the film are "The Watusi Dancing Girls" from Hollywood's Whisky a Go Go club on Sunset Boulevard.

Most of the interior shots - specifically all those of the Lindsay home - were shot at the Brentwood residence of Henry and Shirley Rose at 816 Glenmere Way in West Los Angeles. The Roses were friends of the producer, Edward Janis, with Shirley Rose also being the film's art director. The office scene was shot at the business office of Henry Rose.

All the sculptures and the 'Kingsley the Lion' puppet used in the film, were created by the actor who played Mark - Walker Edmiston, the host of "The Walker Edmiston Show", a children's television program in Los Angeles, which featured puppets of his own creation, including Kingsley the Lion.

Music
The score for The Beach Girls and the Monster was arranged and conducted by Chuck Sagle, and a few of the musicians assembled for the soundtrack were members of the surf band The Hustlers (who are known for their songs "Kopout," "Inertia" and "Wailin’ Out") from Riverside, California. In the book, Pop Surf Culture, written by Brian Chidester and Domenic Priore, the soundtrack of The Beach Girls and the Monster "has got to rank up there among the best … no fewer than 13 different sections of full-bore, deep-reverb tank surf instrumentals throb the soundtrack."

The theme song, "Dance Baby Dance," was written by Frank Sinatra, Jr. and Joan Janis and produced by Edward Janis. Arnold Lessing, who plays Richard, wrote the song he sings in the film, "More Than Wanting You." Walker Edmiston and Elaine DuPont, who play Mark and Jane respectively, wrote "There's a Monster in the Surf."

Critical reception
Writing in AllMovie, reviewer Cavett Binion described the film as a "hysterically awful rubber-suit monster romp" with "a certain ugly charm, according it "so-bad-it's-good" status." A review in DVDTalk reported that "Hall's direction is uninspired, most of the acting is limp, and the dialogue is laughable," that "Frank Sinatra Jr. is credited with providing much of the surfy music, and his score doesn't seem appropriate to any given scene," but that "unlike similar 'so bad, it's good' efforts [...] The Beach Girls and the Monster doesn't overstay its welcome or feel tiresome halfway through."
TV Guide described the film as having "some good suspenseful moments, but, overall, a cheapie scare flick."

Legacy
The film was featured in an episode of Deadly Cinema. The film is listed in Golden Raspberry Award founder John Wilson's book The Official Razzie Movie Guide as one of "The 100 Most Enjoyably Bad Movies Ever Made."
It was also featured in an episode of The Twisted Tales of Felix the Cat in which Felix is trapped inside a VCR and has to survive various movies. In 2019 film was used as source material in surf rock band Robert Shredford's music video for the song "Shreddy Betty".

See also
List of American films of 1965

References

External links

 
 
 

1965 films
1965 horror films
Beach party films
1960s monster movies
American monster movies
Films about fish
Films set in Santa Monica, California
Films shot in Los Angeles
1960s English-language films
1960s American films